Trifurcula pederi is a moth of the family Nepticulidae. It is found in Spain.

The wingspan is 4.2-5.8 mm.

External links
Seven New Species Of The Subgenus Glaucolepis Braun From Southern Europe (Lepidoptera: Nepticulidae, Trifurcula)

Nepticulidae
Moths of Europe
Fauna of Spain
Moths described in 2007